Banisterobates is an ichnogenus of dinosaur footprint. It was found in Virginia and dates from the Triassic period.

See also

 List of dinosaur ichnogenera

References

 

Dinosaur trace fossils